Count of Diois (or Dyois) is a title of nobility, originally in French peerage. It was created in 1350 inside Dauphine of Viennois Patrimony by Philip VI of France when Humbert II of Viennois sold his lands and titles to King Philip VI of France. All patrimony of Dauphine consisted in: Count of Albon, Grésivaudan, Briançonnais, Grenoble, Oisans, Briançon, Embrun and Gaph, Baron de La Tour du Pin, Dauphin of Viennois, count of Valentinois, and given to Cesar Borgia join to Duke of Valentinois by Louis XII of France.

Background 
The county of Dyois born inside a Patrimony of Dauphiny of Viennois, an ancient group of lands and titles part of Holy Roman Empire since 1032. All titles were under Dauphin of Viennois denomination and Houses which were its owner, were powerful in late-Middle Ages and renaissance. In the 15th century, Dauphiny of Viennois at the head of House de La Tour du Pin, presented several conflicts in pursuit of absolutist Capet-Valois policy. It was a fortune for France that , last Dauphin of Viennois, had been incompetent and extravagant, lacking the warlike ardour of his brother Guigues VIII. How Dauphine he depleted his treasury funding a vain Crusade to rescue the Holy Land, failuring at all in his propose and after the death of his only son André and without issue and being an incompetent and luxurious man, he decides sale his patrimony to the best offer.

With financial difficulties building up, he made an inventory of his possessions, with the hope of selling them to Pope Benedict XII in 1339, but when Pope Clement VI brought the two sides to negotiations, the terms included the possibility of Humbert marrying Bianca of Savoy, though this did not reach agreement. The planned sale to the pope falling through, Humbert finally succeeded in completing a sale to Philip VI of France in 1349 for 400,000 écus and an annual pension. To save appearances, however, the sale was referred to as a "transfer". In order to prevent the title from going into abeyance or being swallowed up in another sovereign title, Humbert instituted the "Delphinal Statute" whereby the Dauphiné was exempted from many taxes and imposts. This statute was subject to much parliamentary debate at regional level, as local leaders sought to defend their autonomy and privilege against the state.

Instituted from 1349 as Royal patrimony, Dauphiny of Viennois was transformed in Dauphiny of France, a title was carried by all heirs of France. In 1498 and more than a century after, Louis XII of France divided Dauphiny lands and delivered Valence, Diois, Grenoble in quality of Dukedom and Counties at Cesar Borgia when Pope Alexander VI gave his support in pursuit of defense of great feudal lords and because annulled his marriage with Joan and instead married Anne of Brittany, the widow of his cousin Charles VIII. This marriage allowed Louis to reinforce the personal Union of Brittany and France.

Counts of Diois / Dyois 
House of Valois
 Charles I of Viennois (1338–1380), also king of France as Charles V, Dauphin of Viennois, Count of Diois and Valentinois, Duke of Normandy, ruled the dauphinate as the first Dauphin of France (1350–1364) and ruled the dauphinate as king of France (1364–1366)
 John, Dauphin of France (1366), John III of Viennois, Dauphin of Viennois, Count of Diois and Valentinois, ruled the dauphinate as second Dauphin of France (1366)
 Charles I of Viennois, ruled the dauphinate as king of France (1366–1368)
 Charles II of Viennois (1368–1422),also king of France as Charles VI, Dauphin of Viennois, Count of Diois and Valentinois, ruled the dauphinate as third Dauphin of France (1368–1380), ruled the dauphinate as king of France (1380–1386)
Charles III of Viennois (1386), Dauphin of Viennois, Count of Diois and Valentinois, ruled the dauphinate as fourth Dauphin of France (1386)
 Charles II of Viennois, ruled the dauphinate as king of France (1386–1392)
 Charles IV of Viennois (1392-1401), Dauphin of Viennois, Count of Diois and Valentinois, Duke of Guyenne, ruled the dauphinate as fifth Dauphin of France (1392–1401)
 Louis I of Viennois (1397–1415), Dauphin of Viennois, Count of Diois and Valentinois, Duke of Guyenne, ruled the dauphinate as sixth Dauphin of France (1401–1415)
 John IV of Viennois (1398–1417), Dauphin of Viennois, Count of Diois and Valentinois, Duke of Touraine, ruled the dauphinate as seventh Dauphin of France (1415–1417)
 Charles V of Viennois (1403–1461), also king of France as Charles VII, Dauphin of Viennois, Count of Diois, Valentinois and Ponthieu, ruled the dauphinate as eighth Dauphin of France (1417–1422), ruled the dauphinate as king of France/King of Bourges (1422–1423/1429)
 Louis II of Viennois (1423–1483), also king of France as Louis XI, Dauphin of Viennois, Count of Diois and Valentinois, ruled the dauphinate as ninth Dauphin of France (1423/1429–1461), ruled the dauphinate as king of France (1461–1466)

House of Borgia
 Cesar Borgia, Prince of Andria, Prince of Venafri, Duke of Valentinois, Duke of Romagna created by apostolic authority and cardinals coincil, Duke of Urbino, Count of Dyois, Duke of Camerino by apostolic authority and cardinal coincil and Lord of Imola, Forlì, Sassoferrato, Fermo, Fano, Cesena, Pesaro, Rimini, Faenza, Montefiore, Sant'Arcangelo, Verucchio, Catezza, Savignano, Meldola, Porto Cesenatico, Tossignano, Salaruolo, Monte Battaglia, Forlimpopoli, Bertinoro.
 House of Borgia. title of Count of Diois is part of "Mayorazgo" instituted by Pope Alexander VI (Rodrigo Borgia).

Diois lands remained after dead of Cesar Borgia under Kingdom of France domine as part of dauphinate, with French revolution passed to Republic of France and Napoleonic empire until it was instaurated the third Republic of France when Diois remained joined to French Republic as region denominated Diois inside French Drôme department in southeastern France and the commune of Die.

According to actual laws in Republic of France, title Count of Diois doesn't exist just like all of ancient noble titles of Kingdom of France and Napoleonic empire; nevertheless, same laws permit its use like part of name as particle of dignity.

References 

Dauphins of Viennois
Counts of France
Kingdom of France
14th-century peers of France
 
Lists of French nobility
Diois